Isabella Rose M. Blake-Thomas (born 21 September 2002) is an English actress, known for her roles as Princess January in Secret Society of Second-Born Royals, Young Zelena in Once Upon a Time, Peggy Kendall in Game Shakers and Sam in Maybe I'm Fine.

Career 
Blake-Thomas was born in London. Her first role was at the age of five, when she was selected to present the CBeebies television programme Green Balloon Club. This ran for one season between 2008 and 2009. Later in 2009, she had a minor role in the biographical television film Enid, In 2010, she was cast in an adaptation of the Just William series of books, playing Violet-Elizabeth Bott. Blake-Thomas had a role as 'Izzie', in the 2011 film Johnny English Reborn. Her first lead role was in the 2011 independent film Little Glory as Julie, alongside Cameron Bright. In 2012, Blake-Thomas played the part of Annabelle Crumb in the BBC Christmas adaptation of the David Walliams book Mr. Stink. She also appeared in the DreamWorks animation of Rise of the Guardians.

In 2013, she appeared in Midsomer Murders, Doctor Who and Dancing on the Edge alongside Chiwetel Ejiofor. In 2014, Blake-Thomas appeared in The Smoke on BBC and Da Vinci's Demons. She later appeared in the FX show Married, in 2015. The following year she appeared in Game Shakers, Shameless and ABC's Once Upon a Time as the recurring younger version of Rebecca Mader. In 2017, she re-appeared in Once Upon a Time and continued on as the lead role in Keplers' Dream with Holland Taylor, Kelly Lynch, Sean Patrick Flanery and Steven Michael Quezada. She also starred in The League of Legend Keepers: Shadows and Pretty Outrageous. In 2018 Blake-Thomas appeared in the leading role of Sam in Maybe I'm Fine alongside Kelly Sullivan, Rob Mayes, Flex Alexander and Daniela Alonso. She can be seen as Jon Voight's daughter in Orphan Horse and Pepper in Turnover. She also made her 1st AD debut on the film Running on Empty. In February 2018, Blake-Thomas released her debut single "Blame" which can be found on Spotify, iTunes, Amazon Music and more. Her music video is available for viewing on YouTube starring, Blake-Thomas and Matt Cornett. Blake-Thomas then went on to release two EP's and a remix in 2019. Her debut EP was Stronger and her second was Painless.

In 2017, Isabella Blake-Thomas and her mother, director Elizabeth Blake-Thomas, founded Mother & Daughter Entertainment, their production company who's slogan is "Making content that matters". In 2019, actress Chandler Kinney (Lethal Weapon, Z-O-M-B-I-E-S-2) and her mother Taryn Kinney joined the MDE team.

Personal life 

Blake-Thomas was born in London and lives with her mother Elizabeth Blake-Thomas. She attended Hampton Court House School in 2010 and was later homeschooled. She currently lives in Los Angeles, California.

Filmography

Film

Television

References

External links 
 
 

2002 births
English child actresses
English television actresses
Living people
Actresses from London
21st-century English actresses